Platon Oyunsky ((— 31 October 1939) was the pseudonym of Platon Alekseevich Sleptsov who was a Yakut Soviet writer, philologist and public figure and one of the founders of Yakut literature.

Early life
He was born in 3 Zhekhsogon nasleg of Boturuss (nowadays Tatta) ulus. The etymology of the family name "Sleptsov" is that it came from the word meaning "a shaman" – such is the source of Oyunsky's pen-name.

Career
Oyunsky became a member of the Russian Communist Party (b) in March 1918. In 1921 the chairman of the Gubrevkom of Yakutia, in 1922 the chairman of the Council of People's Commissars, in 1923 the chairman of the Central Executive Committee of the Yakut Autonomous Soviet Socialist Republic.

Sleptsov was a Soviet Yakut statesman, writer, translator and champion of Yakuts language. In addition, he was  seen as one of the founders of modern Yakut literature. He took part in creating the national written language and in culturally building the modern Yakut nation. Oyunsky is one of organizers of the Yakut Autonomous Republic, the Union of Writers of Yakutia, and the Language and Literature Scientific Research Institute.

Oyunsky collected and published a number of Olonkho epic poems from the collected heroic epic poetry of the Yakuts.

Death
He was prosecuted during the Great Purge, and died in prison in Yakutsk in 1939. Oyunsky was officially rehabilitated on 15 October 1955.

Legacy
The State Prize of the Yakut ASSR, awarded for achievements in literature, arts, and architecture, is named after him. His name graces the Sakha Drama Theater, a literary museum, and one of the streets in Yakutsk.

Personal life
Oyunsky's daughter Sardana was a folklorist of note.

Further reading
 Oleg K. Abramov. Moloch of GULAG: the similarity of the fate of the three leaders of the Siberian national republics. (Platon Oyunsky, Rinchingiin Elbegdorj, Michah Erbanov. Post-Revolutionary: 1921—1938). // Philosophical Faculty of the Tomsk State University. Tomsk, May 16, 2015. / Editor-in-chief V. Shutov. — Tomsk, 2015. — P. 106—120. — . — Internet resource: vital.lib.tsu.ru (in Russian)

External links
 The Yakut state literary museum named by P.A.Ojunskiy at Google Cultural Institute

Notes

A fictionalized biography of Platon Oyunsky features prominently in Stefan Sullivan's Sibirischer Schwindel (Eichborn/Frankfurt, 2002).

Yakut people
Soviet writers
Soviet rehabilitations
Soviet people who died in prison custody
Sakha-language writers
Translators to Sakha
1893 births
1939 deaths
Great Purge victims from Russia
Tomsk State Pedagogical University alumni
20th-century translators
Yakut mythology